Elusive Wave (foaled April 20, 2006 in Ireland) is a Thoroughbred racehorse based in France. She was bred by Pier House Stud. She is owned by Martin S. Schwartz.  She was trained by Jean-Claude Rouget and ridden by Christophe Lemaire.

Breeding record

2015 Filly, bred in Japan, by Deep Impact (JPN)

2016 Colt, bred in Japan, by Deep Impact (JPN)

Pedigree

References
 Elusive Wave's Pedigree and Racing Stats
 Video at YouTube of Elusive Wave winning the Poule d'Essai des Pouliches
 Elusive Wave's Pedigree

2006 racehorse births
Thoroughbred family 1-o
Racehorses bred in Ireland
Racehorses trained in France